National League of Translators and Interpreters  — a guild-type NGO of professional freelance translators and interpreters of Russia. The league was established in 2004 in Moscow as a Non-Profit Partnership, having since developed sections in Saint-Petersburg and Sochi. The entity is cooperating with the Union of Translators of Russia on issues of importance for translation and language interpretation industry.

Organizational structure 
 General meeting of the members
 Board of the Partnership
 President and Vice-President
 Heads of Councils and Committees

President 
 2004-2014 — Mr. Yury M. Alekseev
 2014-current — Mr. Nikolay K. Duplensky

Professional activities 
 Organizing professional seminars, roundtables and symposia
 Taking part in developing standards and methodologic materials

References

External links

See also 

 International Translation Day
 Category:Russian translators

Organizations established in 2004
Translation organizations
Non-profit organizations based in Russia